Anabropsis is a genus of king crickets in the tribe Anabropsini. They are found tropical areas of the Americas, Africa and Asia.

Species
The Orthoptera Species File currently lists five subgenera, until recently, all placed at genus level:

subgenus Anabropsis
Auth.: Rehn, 1901 - central Americas
species group alata (Brunner von Wattenwyl, 1888)
 Anabropsis alata (Brunner von Wattenwyl, 1888)
 Anabropsis longipenna Gorochov & Cadena-Castañeda, 2016
 Anabropsis marmorata Rehn, 1905
 Anabropsis rentzi Cadena-Castañeda & Cortés-Torres, 2013
 Anabropsis weissmani Cadena-Castañeda & Gorochov, 2016
species group aptera (Brunner von Wattenwyl, 1888)
 Anabropsis aptera (Brunner von Wattenwyl, 1888)
 Anabropsis apteroides Cadena-Castañeda & Gorochov, 2016
 Anabropsis chiapas Gorochov & Cadena-Castañeda, 2016
 Anabropsis homerogomezi Cadena-Castañeda & Weissman, 2020
 Anabropsis oaxaca Gorochov & Cadena-Castañeda, 2016
 Anabropsis saltatrix (Saussure & Pictet, 1897)
species group mexicana (Saussure, 1859)
 Anabropsis costaricensis Rehn, 1905
 Anabropsis mexicana (Saussure, 1859) - type species (as Schoenobates mexicanus Saussure)
 Anabropsis modesta Gorochov, 2001
 Anabropsis spinigera Gorochov, 2001
species group microptera Gorochov, 2001
 Anabropsis johnsi Cadena-Castañeda & Gorochov, 2016
 Anabropsis kasparyani Gorochov & Cadena-Castañeda, 2016
 Anabropsis microptera Gorochov, 2001
 Anabropsis proxima Gorochov & Cadena-Castañeda, 2016

Apteranabropsis
Auth.: Gorochov, 1988 - China and Vietnam.
 Anabropsis abramovi Gorochov, 2021 (2 subspecies)
 Anabropsis ailaoshanica Gorochov, 2021
 Anabropsis cervicornis Karny, 1930
 Anabropsis costulata (Gorochov, 2001)
 Anabropsis guangxiensis (Bian & Shi, 2015)
 Anabropsis maculata Gorochov, 2021
 Anabropsis minuta (Gorochov, 2001)
 Anabropsis miser Bey-Bienko, 1968
 Anabropsis multispinula Lu, Lin, Liu, Liang & Bian, 2022
 Anabropsis paracostulata (Gorochov, 2010)
 Anabropsis shii Lu, Lin, Liu, Liang & Bian, 2022
 Anabropsis sinica Bey-Bienko, 1962
 Anabropsis tarasovi Gorochov, 2021
 Anabropsis tonkinensis Rehn, 1906

Carnabropsis
Auth.: Gorochov, 2021 - China, Vietnam
 Anabropsis carnarius (Gorochov, 1998)
 Anabropsis crenatis (Song, Bian & Shi, 2016)
 Anabropsis guadun (Ingrisch, 2019)
 Anabropsis incisa (Song, Bian & Shi, 2016)
 Anabropsis infuscata (Wang, Liu & Li, 2015)
 Anabropsis karnyi (Wang, Liu & Li, 2015)
 Anabropsis parallela (Wang, Liu & Li, 2015)
 Anabropsis pusilla (Ingrisch, 2019)
 Anabropsis tenchongensis (Wang, Liu & Li, 2015)

Paterdecolyus
Auth.: Griffini, 1913 - India, Tibet
Anabropsis dubius (Würmli, 1973)
Anabropsis femoratus (Pictet & Saussure, 1893)
Anabropsis frater (Brunner von Wattenwyl, 1888)
Anabropsis magnimaculatus (Bian & Shi, 2019)
Anabropsis panteli (Griffini, 1913) (type)

Pteranabropsis
Auth.: Gorochov, 1988 - China, Vietnam
 Anabropsis angusta (Ingrisch, 2019)
 Anabropsis bavi (Ingrisch, 2019)
 Anabropsis carli Griffini, 1911
 Anabropsis copia (Ingrisch, 2019)
 Anabropsis cuspis (Ingrisch, 2019)
 Anabropsis falcata (Shi & Bian, 2016)
 Anabropsis intermedia Gorochov, 2021

subgenus not assigned
Anabropsis chopardi Karny, 1932 - Madagascar
Anabropsis rehni Griffini, 1909 - central Africa
Anabropsis tibetensis (Wang, Liu & Li, 2015) - Tibet

References

External links
Photo at iNaturalist

Anostostomatidae
Ensifera genera
Orthoptera of Asia
Orthoptera of Africa